Jean-Paul Stephen St-Laurent (23 April 1912 – 22 December 1986) was a Canadian politician. He was born in Quebec City, Quebec.

The son of former Prime Minister Louis St. Laurent and Jeanne Renault, Jean-Paul represented the electoral district of Témiscouata in the House of Commons of Canada from 1955 to 1958.

St. Laurent was a member of the Liberal Party.

He died aged 74 in 1986.

External links

Jean-Paul St. Laurent's genealogical profile

References 

1912 births
1986 deaths
Children of prime ministers of Canada
Liberal Party of Canada MPs
Members of the House of Commons of Canada from Quebec
Politicians from Quebec City